Dr. Kinshuk, who goes by a single name , is a dean at the College of Information and professor in the department of learning technologies at the University of North Texas. His research and activities of interest include learning analytics, learning technologies, mobile, ubiquitous, and location aware learning systems, cognitive profiling, and interactive technologies.

Kinshuk has served as industrial research chair of the Natural Sciences and Engineering Research Council of Canada in 2010, a professor in the School of Computing and Information Systems at Athabasca University, and associate dean in the Faculty of Science and Technology at Athabasca University. Kinshuk currently serves on the board of directors for the US India Chamber of Commerce.

Kinshuk was born in Rajasthan, India, and earned a Bachelor of Mechanical Engineering from Rajasthan University in 1992, a Master of Science in mechanical computer aided engineering from Strathclyde University in Scotland, and a Ph.D. from De Montfort University in Leicester, United Kingdom in 1996.

Books 

 Kinshuk (2016). Designing Adaptive and Personalized Learning Environments, New York:  Routledge.

References

External links 

 Dr. Kinshuk

Living people
People in educational technology
Educational researchers
Athabasca University alumni
Alumni of De Montfort University
University of North Texas faculty
University of North Texas College of Information faculty
Year of birth missing (living people)